Fiji women's national basketball team is the national basketball team from Fiji, administered by the Fiji Amateur Basketball Federation. They played in the 2007 Oceania Championship in Dunedin.

History
Due to their gold medal win at the 2015 Pacific Games, Fiji was given a berth at the 2017 FIBA Asia Cup. After the final match against American Samoa at the Pacific Games, Fiji did not play a competitive match until their FIBA Asia Cup debut.

At most Fiji could use eight players out of the twelve named for the 2017 FIBA Asia Cup, due to the unavailability of the four other players. Fiji finished sixth in the tournament.

Team

Current roster
Roster for the 2017 FIBA Women's Asia Cup.

Past rosters
At the FIBA World Olympic Qualifying Tournament for Women 2008:
 Letava Whippy
 Mikaelar Whippy
 Boulou Tuisou
 Valerie Nainima
 Brittany Hazelman
 Ofa Moce
 Seini Dobui
 Mareta Mani
 Alisi Tabulaevu
 Lusiani Robanakadavu
 Kelera Maitaika
 Vitorina Matila
 coach: Mike Whippy

2007:
Agnes Sokosoko
Batiri Hughes
Brittany Hazelman
Elenoa Naivalurua
Kelera Mataika
Leilani Saukawa
Letava Whippy
Mareta Mani
Mickaelar Whippy
Seini Dobui
Sera Colata
Valerie Nainima

See also
Fiji women's national under-19 basketball team
Fiji women's national under-17 basketball team
Fiji women's national 3x3 team

References

External links
Official website
FIBA profile

 
Women's national basketball teams